Abacetus catersi is a species of ground beetle in the subfamily Pterostichinae. It was described by Straneo in 1958.

References

catersi
Beetles described in 1958